Shamshi Kaldayakov (15 August 1937, Otyrar District, Shauyldyr aul – 29 February 1992, Almaty) was a Kazakh composer. He was born Shamshy Donbayev, but ran away from school and changed his name to avoid the police. He started playing music aged 17 and mainly wrote songs in a waltz style, but in 1956, he composed the music to the patriotic song My Kazakhstan. It was adopted in 2006 to be the Kazakhstan national anthem by Kazakh President Nursultan Nazarbayev after a few modifications in the lyrics.

References

External links
 Biography 

1937 births
1992 deaths
People from Ordabasy District
Kazakhstani composers
Male composers
Kazakhstani musicians
National anthem writers
20th-century male musicians